The athletics events at the 2013 East Asian Games were held in Tianjin, China from 7 to 9 October.

Four Games records were broken at the competition.

Medal summary

Men

Women

Medal table

References 

Medalists
Full results (archived)

Events at the 2013 East Asian Games
2013
East Asian Games
2013 East Asian Games